The Progressive Reform Party (VHP; Sarnami Hindustani: प्रगतिशील सुधार दल, Pragatisheel Sudhaar Dal), formerly known as the United Hindustani Party (Sarnami Hindustani: संयुक्त हिंदुस्तानी पार्टी, Samyukt Hindustani Party; 1949–August 1966) and the Vatan Hitkari Party (English: Party for the Promotion of National Welfare; , Sarnami Hindustani: वतन हितकारी पार्टी, Vatan Hitkari Party; August 1966 – 1973), is a political party in Suriname. It was originally founded in January 1949 as a merger of three parties to represent the Indo-Surinamese community. The party occupies a position straddling the political centre and centre-left, advocating for a combination of social-democratic and social-liberal policies under the Third Way philosophy. During the party's history it frequently allied itself with the National Party of Suriname (NPS) that historically represented the Afro-Surinamese community.

Chan Santokhi is the chairman of the party since 3 July 2011. The VHP is a multi-ethnic party and is primarily supported by Indo-Surinamese. Previous chairman Ram Sardjoe holds the title of honorary chairman. 
After the 2020 parliamentary elections, the Progressive Reform Party is the biggest political party in Suriname. Chan Santokhi became the new President of Suriname.

The party has been part of seven government coalitions, in the periods of: 1958–1963 (5 years), 1963–1967 (4 years), 1969–1973 (4 years), 1987–1991 (4 years), 1991–1996 (5 years), 2000–2005 (5 years) and 2005–2010 (5 years); a total of 32 years. In 2020, the party formed a coalition government with the General Liberation and Development Party led by Ronnie Brunswijk, the new Vice President of Suriname.

Representation 
1949

 S. Rambaran Mishre
 H.W. Mohamed Radja
 L.B. Sitalsing
 H. Shriemisier
 J. Lachmon
 S.M. Jamaludin

1951

 J. Lachmon
 H.S. Radakushun
 H.F. Sewberath Misser
 J.S. Mungra
 K. Kanhai
 R.D. Oedayrajsing Varma

1955

 J. Lachmon
 H.S. Radakushun
 H.F. Sewberath Misser
 J.S. Mungra
 K. Kanhai
 R.D. Oedayrajsing Varma

1958

 J. Lachmon
 H. Mungra
 H.S. Radakushun
 M. Ramdjan

1963

 J.H. Adhin
 J. Lachmon
 B. Laigsingh
 L. Mungra
 R.M. Nannan Panday
 D. Sathoe
 H. Shriemisier

Electoral results

Chairmen 
The party has had four chairmen since its founding:
16 January 1949 – 18 October 2001: Jagernath Lachmon
19 October 2001 – 23 December 2001: 
23 December 2001 – 3 July 2011: Ramdien Sardjoe 
3 July 2011 – present: Chan Santokhi

References

External links
Official website
Official website of Youth Division
Official Facebook Page

Political parties in Suriname
Hindu organisations based in Suriname
Ethnic political parties
Hindu political parties
Social democratic parties in South America
Political parties established in 1949
1949 establishments in South America